St-Just Aviation is a Canadian aircraft manufacturer based in Boucherville, Quebec, a suburb of Montreal. The company specializes in the design and manufacture of aircraft kits for bushplane operations, based on Cessna designs. The company was originally located in Mirabel.

Aircraft

References

External links

Aircraft manufacturers of Canada
Homebuilt aircraft
Companies based in Boucherville